Abdelmalik Lahoulou (born 7 May 1992) is an Algerian athlete specializing in the 400 metres hurdles. He won the silver at the 2015 Summer Universiade. His personal best in the event is 48.47 seconds set at the 2018 African Championships in Athletics. This was the current national record before he improved it to 48.39 at the 2019 World Athletics Championships in Doha.

Competition record

References

External links

 
 
 

1992 births
Living people
People from Jijel
Algerian male hurdlers
World Athletics Championships athletes for Algeria
Athletes (track and field) at the 2016 Summer Olympics
Olympic athletes of Algeria
Athletes (track and field) at the 2015 African Games
African Games gold medalists for Algeria
African Games bronze medalists for Algeria
African Games medalists in athletics (track and field)
Athletes (track and field) at the 2013 Mediterranean Games
Athletes (track and field) at the 2018 Mediterranean Games
Mediterranean Games bronze medalists for Algeria
Universiade medalists in athletics (track and field)
Mediterranean Games medalists in athletics
Universiade silver medalists for Algeria
Universiade bronze medalists for Algeria
Athletes (track and field) at the 2019 African Games
African Championships in Athletics winners
African Games gold medalists in athletics (track and field)
Medalists at the 2015 Summer Universiade
Medalists at the 2017 Summer Universiade
Islamic Solidarity Games competitors for Algeria
Athletes (track and field) at the 2020 Summer Olympics
21st-century Algerian people
Mediterranean Games gold medalists in athletics
Athletes (track and field) at the 2022 Mediterranean Games
|-